Hour of 13 is an American doom metal  band that formed in Hickory, North Carolina in 2006 and is currently signed to Shadow Kingdom Records. Taking their name from the film titled City of the Dead. The band combines doom metal with a traditional heavy metal sound.

Biography
In 2007 the band released their self-titled debut album on Shadow Kingdom Records.
In 2009 Swanson left the band leaving Davis to form a new line up. However, Swanson returned later in the year, and the band became a duo once again. In 2010, the second album titled The Ritualist was released on Eyes Like Snow. In 2011 Swanson left again and Ben Hogg was found as his replacement. But in November, Swanson rejoined the band for a second time working with Davis on a new album which was released in May 2012 via Earache Records. In late 2012 Who's to Blame? was released  as the band's debut music video.

Status 
Hour of 13 - Statement - 10-1-2016

"2006 was an immense year for influence and creation. A simple session of writing spawned three songs that paved the way
for a debut album destined to return American Heavy Metal back to the forefront of the underground Metal scene. And with
the release came a quick acclaim, building up a following that the entity itself never saw coming. Throughout its lifespan,
HOUR OF 13 has seen its fair share of ups and downs. Not ever really existing in the other classes of bands within its
scene, it paved a path of Darkness and gloom that solidified its place within the tops of the genre. All that rise must fall...

Due to a professional ordeal that was both good and bad, along with the passing of some of its closest friends, the idea to
lay it to rest until the right time was evident and heeded. Coupled with all of the problems, departures and returns, backlash
and all around trash talk, the ideals were continued under the NIGHT MAGIC name. The slumber for Ho13 in its name
had been thought to be eternal. Forever.
But, as we all know, NOTHING is forever..

As of 10-1-2016, I am pleased to announce the chains of past problems have been broken, and with the aid and support of the
following gained within its initial unveiling, HOUR OF 13 have resumed exactly where it was laid to rest. To be honest, I
myself have been waiting, and waiting, and waiting for the day this could be. All I have wanted was to feel the fires of creation
rise, and I am more than excited to be able to continue the original intent of HOUR OF 13. Complete details as to the current
incarnation of this rebirth is unknown at the moment. However, to be able to bring to you, the supporters, this return is very
much my namesake.

With this return also comes the announcement of an HOUR OF 13 retrospect double LP/CD/Cassette release coming later this
year. Titled "Salt The Dead: Rare and Unreleased", this collection contains material from the beginning up until its rest. Shadow
Kingdom Records, who gave Ho13 its initial push with the release of the debut album, will release this collection. More info
will be announced when the release dates are known.

Hails to each and every one of you. I honor your support til the ends of the Earth. In His name we praise the fires of Hell!

Regards,
Chad Davis - Hour of 13"

Discography
 Hour of 13 (2007)
 The Ritualist (2010)
 Possession / Darkness (2010) - Single
 The Rites of Samhain (2010) - EP
 333 (2012)
 Lucky Bones (2012) - EP
 "Black Magick Rites" (2021)

Lineup

Current members
 Chad Davis – guitars/bass/drums/vocals (2006–present)

Former members
 Phil Swanson - vocals (2006–09, 2009–11, 2011–13)
 Brandon Munday - guitars (2010–13)
 Ben Hogg - vocals (2011)
 Emile Quigley - bass (2012)
 Anaïs Chareyre - drums (2012)
 Lar Bowler - guitars (2012)
 Luc Valcourt - drums
 Corey Leonard - guitars
 Robb Pritchard - vocals
 John Mode - bass
 Mark Eles - bass
 Chris Taylor - drums
 Dave Easter - drums
 Ryan Adams - guitars

References

External links
Hour of 13 on Metalstorm
Hour of 13 on Allmusic
Hour of 13 on Rate Your Music
Hour of 13 on Encyclopedia Metallum

Heavy metal musical groups from North Carolina
American doom metal musical groups
Musical groups established in 2006
Occult rock musical groups